Street Legal Racing Redline is a racing game developed by Invictus and published by Activision Value.  The game was released for Windows in July 2003.

On September 9, 2014, Invictus announced via their Facebook page that the Street Legal franchise, as well as every other game Invictus had developed using that game engine was now abandonware, and the engine, along with all the art assets, were for sale.

On May 7, 2016, the game was re-released by ImageCode LLC. on Steam.

Gameplay

The game takes place in Valo City (possibly a play on the word "velocity"), a metropolis known for its vast underworld of illegal street racing. The plot of the game is to beat every club and accomplish the requirements to enter the Race of Champions, a prestigious racing competition where one can win a bonus car. Players have to race others on the streets during the day for prestige (respect) or money to customize the car. During the night, players can either participate in a drag race against another driver or watch the race. And also the newly added race tracks that allows the player to race their own vehicles against AI's on a race track to win a prize.

A unique feature of the game is its detailed level of customization for the vehicles. The player can buy a completely new car from the dealership, a used one from a local shop where they were already customized or even totaled, or build the car from scratch with a chassis. Unlike a traditional street racing video game if the player crashes their car the consequences are very real and must manually replace each part that got destroyed in the crash.

Patches

Currently, there are three patches for the game: the 2.2.1 MWM (by Miran & Wichur), 2.3.0 Live Edition (by Raxat), and SLRR2015 (by Bigg Boss93, available on VStanced.com). The latest version (2.3.1) was released on Steam and is gradually improved by the Russian game developer ImageCode in collaboration with Raxat.

Mods

Thousands of mods were made for this game, including vehicles, parts for said vehicles, tracks (Some mods only work on the 2.2.1 MWM version), sounds, menu interfaces, and textures. Because some of the versions of the game are highly unstable, it is highly likely to crash when too many mods are installed mainly on the 2.2.1 and 2.3.0 versions.

Reboot

Thanks to public funding, the game was greenlit and eventually re-released on Steam on May 7, 2016. The Steam release was very unstable when it first launched, but is gradually improving. Its textures and interface make it more contemporary, and the career is altered for more of a challenge.

Possible sequel
Dave Singh, the owner of streetlegalmods.com, made a deal with Invictus Games, Ltd. stating that if the Kickstarter crowdfunding campaign reached a minimum of $150,000, the development of the sequel to SLRR, Street Tuning Evolution, would officially begin, as long as the game was playable and the community was allowed to add content. $500,000 was demanded to make a complete game.

After having a bad launch with the Kickstarter, and due to the popular demand of a PayPal option, Invictus Games, Ltd. and Dave Singh decided to move the campaign to Indiegogo to solve the many problems, and also to extend the deadline. Backers could then use PayPal to make a pledge. The campaign would have been funded only if it had reached $150,000. The IndieGogo campaign had a significantly better launch than the Kickstarter campaign, which raised around $24,000 a little more than 40 days after its launch on December 18, 2014. The IndieGogo campaign raised nearly $10,000 just one day after its launch. Unfortunately the campaign failed, reaching just over $30,000.

Despite the failure, another person, Bartosz "Wichur" Bieszka, plans to make a sequel to this game under the "Car Tune" title. ImageCode LLC. took over development for Street Tuning Evolution, which means the game is still very much alive, and will continue the progress from Invictus Games, Ltd.'s work.

References

2003 video games
Activision games
Cancelled macOS games
Racing video games
Street racing video games
Video games developed in Hungary
Windows games
Windows-only games